Cattelan is a surname. Notable people with the surname include:

Alessandro Cattelan (born 1980), Italian television personality
Maurizio Cattelan (born 1960), Italian artist